Constance Wilson-Samuel (January 7, 1908 – April 6, 1963) was a Canadian figure skater, born in Toronto, Ontario. Competing in ladies' singles, she became the 1932 World bronze medallist, a four-time North American champion, and a nine-time Canadian national champion. She competed at three Olympics, placing sixth in 1928 and fourth in 1932.

Wilson-Samuel also competed in pair skating. With her brother Montgomery Wilson, she was a three-time North American champion and a five-time Canadian national champion. They placed fifth at the 1932 Olympics. She won silver in four skating at the 1933 North American Championships in partnership with her brother, Elizabeth Fisher, and Hubert Sprott.

Results

Ladies' singles

Pairs with Morson

Pairs with Wilson

Fours with Fisher, Wilson, and Sprott

References

1908 births
1963 deaths
Figure skaters from Toronto
Canadian female single skaters
Canadian female pair skaters
Figure skaters at the 1928 Winter Olympics
Figure skaters at the 1932 Winter Olympics
Figure skaters at the 1936 Winter Olympics
Olympic figure skaters of Canada
World Figure Skating Championships medalists